Bruno Reversade (born 1978) is an American human geneticist and developmental biologist . He is a Director of the Institute of Molecular and Cellular Biology and the Genome Institute of Singapore at A*STAR (Singapore) and holds several faculty positions at other universities. Reversade is known for identifying mutated genes that cause Mendelian diseases, for his research on the genetics of identical twins and for the characterizations of novel hormones.

Early life and education
Bruno Reversade was born in 1974 into a French-American family. He was raised in Grenoble (France) and Washington, D.C. (US). Bruno Reversade studied at the University Joseph Fourier, Pierre and Marie Curie University and UCLA.

Scientific career
Reversade became interested in developmental biology in 1997 when studying at the University of Western Ontario (Canada) under the tutelage of Greg Kelly.

He earned his master's degree at the Pasteur Institute (Paris, France), where he studied head development in the mouse embryo. He then moved to the United States to work at the HHMI laboratory of Edward M. De Robertis at the University of California, Los Angeles. There he studied the specification of the dorsal-ventral axis during vertebrate development using Xenopus embryos. In 2005, Reversade and De Robertis detailed how multiple extracellular proteins allow embryos that are cut in two to self-regulate consistently.

In 2006, Reversade earned his PhD from the Pierre and Marie Curie University. In 2008, he received the A*STAR investigatorship (Singapore) award and set up his team in 2008 at the Institute of Medical Biology to carry out human embryology and genetic research. In 2015, he became a Director at A*STAR. Also in 2015, he received AAA Fellowship from the Vrije Universiteit Amsterdam and was appointed Professor of Human Genetics at the Centre for Reproductive Medicine at the university's Academic Medical Center. Since 2016, Reversade is a Distinguished Professor of Human Genetics at Koç University (Turkey).

Research areas

Mendelian genetics
Reversade's team works on the genetic characterization and clinical description of inherited conditions in humans.

They has identified mutations responsible for progeroid syndromes in humans, NLRP1 inflammasome-related diseases, and self-healing cancers.

Reversade's group has identified the following mutated genes to be responsible for novel Mendelian diseases:

Developmental biology and Twinning
Reversade's investigations in developmental biology have relied on various animal model organisms (C. elegans, Drosophila, zebrafish, Xenopus and transgenic mice) and 
covered such embryonic processes as neural induction, limb development, and various human diseases causing birth defects.

In 2005, during his Ph.D. thesis in the laboratory of Edward De Robertis, the scientists published two discoveries, pertaining to the self-regulation of an embryonic morphogenetic field mediated by the extracellular Chordin/BMP/Sizzled pathway. This helped provide a molecular framework for how embryos split in two halves can develop into perfect, albeit smaller, identical twinned embryos.

Reversade also researches the genetics of dizygotic and monozygotic twinning in humans. He has been searching for genes responsible for monozygotic (MZ) twinning from rare population isolates.

In 2021, together with the VU Amsterdam, his group revealed that MZ twins harbor an epigenetic signature in their somatic tissue even decades after their birth. This stable DNA mark could be employed to retrospectively assess if a person is a MZ twin even if his/her co-twin vanished in utero.

Hormones and Micropeptides
Reversade's research has also pioneered the annotation of novel micropeptides.

ELABELA   In 2013, he discovered and patented a novel hormone named Elabela (ELA). This secreted circulating peptide works as an endogenous ligand for the Apelin receptor (a G protein-coupled receptor). The genetic inactivation of ELA leads to cardiovascular defects, predisposes to preeclampsia and is needed for the self-renewal of human embryonic stem cells. Analogues of Elabela have entered clinical trials by Amgen.
 BRAWNIN  In 2020, he participated in the characterization of C12orf73, a protein-coding gene responsible for the making of a 71 amino-acid peptide called BRAWNIN.  This small peptide is essential for respiratory chain complex III (CIII) assembly in human cells and zebrafish.
C2orf69   In 2021, together with I. Kurth and colleagues, his team identified a fatal syndrome caused by the homozygous inactivation of C2orf69. This gene codes for a 385 amino-acid peptide which can be secreted or associated with mitochondria.  C2ORF69 possesses homology to esterase/lipase enzymes.

Awards and recognition
 Society-in-Science Branco Weiss Fellowship (2007), ETH Zurich;
 Inaugural A*STAR Investigatorship award (2008), Agency for Science, Technology and Research;
 EMBO Young Investigator award (2012), European Molecular Biology Organization;
 AAA Fellow (2015), Vrije Universiteit Amsterdam;
 Senior NRF Investigator (2018), National Research Foundation, Government of Singapore.

References

External links
Official web site

1978 births
Living people
American people of French descent
American embryologists
American geneticists
Developmental biologists
Academic staff of Vrije Universiteit Amsterdam
Academic staff of Koç University
Pierre and Marie Curie University alumni
American expatriates in the Netherlands
American expatriates in Turkey
21st-century American biologists
American expatriates in Singapore
American expatriate academics
American expatriates in France